Shi'r (Arabic: مجلة شعر; Poetry) was an avant-garde and modernist monthly literary magazine with a special reference to poetry. The magazine was published in Beirut, Lebanon, between 1957 and 1970 with a three-year interruption. The founders were two leading literary figures: Yusuf al-Khal and Adunis. It was named after Harriet Monroe’s Chicago-based magazine, Poetry.

History and profile
Shi'r was started in Beirut in 1957, and the first issue appeared in January. Its founders were Yusuf al-Khal, Adunis and Unsi Al Hajj. It was started as a quarterly, but later its frequency was switched to monthly.

Their goal in establishing Shi'r which was an avant-garde journal was to present a non-political version of poetry. This version of poetry is called Al Shi'r al Hurr (Arabic: Free Poetry) which refers to prose poetry. Therefore, it adopted a modernist approach towards poetry. The magazine also aimed at supporting the Afro-Asian solidarity and nonalignment which had been stated in the Bandung Conference in 1955. 

Al-Khal was the editor-in-chief of Shi'r. Adunis served in different positions: at the beginning he was the editor and from 1958 he began to function as the secretary of the editorial board. He became the managing editor in 1961 and co-owner and co-editor-in-chief of Shi'r in 1963. However, he left the magazine soon after these roles.

The contributors were part of the Shi'r school, and the magazine was an organ of this movement. The magazine was significantly affected from Ahmed Zaki Abu Shadi's the Apollo Poet Society founded in Cairo, Egypt, in 1932. Salma Khadra Jayyusi argues that Shi'r is, in fact, the successor of Apollo which was the publication of this society. Sargon Boulus, an Iraq-born Assyrian poet, started his career in the magazine in 1961.

Although both were avant-garde publications and supported free verse movement, Al Adab, a literary magazine established in Beirut in 1953, was the main adversary of Shi'r. Because the contributors of Shi'r opposed the movement of committed literature (al-adab al-multazim in Arabic), a dominant approach in the 1950s and 1960s in the Arab world which was also supported by Al Adab.

Shi'r was banned in some countries due to its alleged support for the cultural war against Arab nationalism and its being funded by the CIA and French intelligence. It was temporarily shut down in 1964 and was restarted in Spring 1967. In the second phase al-Khal also served as the editor-in-chief of the magazine of which the scope was expanded to cover other literary subjects in addition to poetry. Shi'r ceased publication in Autumn 1970 after publishing forty-four issues.

Studies on Shi'r
Kamal Kheir Beik, a Syria-born dissident and poet, analyzed Shi'r in his PhD thesis which was completed at the University of Geneva in 1972. Another comprehensive study on Shi'r is a book by Dounia Badini published in 2009.

References

1957 establishments in Lebanon
1970 disestablishments in Lebanon
Avant-garde magazines
Defunct magazines published in Lebanon
Magazines published in Beirut
Magazines established in 1957
Magazines disestablished in 1970
Monthly magazines published in Lebanon
Poetry literary magazines
Defunct literary magazines
Literary magazines published in Lebanon
Modernism